Lybeck is a surname of Norwegian, Danish or Swedish origin. Notable people with the surname include:

Baba Lybeck (born 1966), Finnish journalist and television presenter
Jan Lybeck, Swedish competitive sailor
Otto Lybeck (1871–1947), Swedish Navy admiral
Sigurd Lybeck (1895–1975), Norwegian farmer and writer

References

Surnames of Norwegian origin
Surnames of Danish origin
Surnames of Swedish origin